The pine forest stream frog (Ptychohyla macrotympanum)  is a species of frog in the family Hylidae found in Guatemala and possibly Mexico. Its natural habitats are subtropical or tropical dry forests, rivers, and heavily degraded former forest. It is threatened by habitat loss.

Besides habitat loss, invasive species and diseases contribute to the decline of the pine forest stream frog. Studies and actions have been taken place in order to help the species such as the barriers around the habitat and treatments for the diseases.

References

Ptychohyla
Frogs of North America
Amphibians of Guatemala
Critically endangered fauna of North America
Amphibians described in 1992
Taxonomy articles created by Polbot